This is a list of species in the predominantly crustose lichen genus Buellia. They are commonly known as "button lichens" due to the characteristic shape of their apothecia. A 2020 estimate placed about 300 species in the genus. , Species Fungorum accepts 201 species (including 9 varieties) in Buellia.

A

Buellia adjuncta 
Buellia aequata 
Buellia aeruginascens 
Buellia aeruginosa  – Australia
Buellia aethalea 
Buellia akatorensis  – New Zealand
Buellia albulella  – Australia
Buellia alectorialica  – New Zealand
Buellia amandineiformis  – Australia
Buellia amblyogona 
Buellia arborea 
Buellia arenaria 
Buellia arnoldii 
Buellia asterella 
Buellia atroflavella 
Buellia austera  – Australia
Buellia austroabstracta  – Australia
Buellia austroalpina  – Australia

B

Buellia badia 
Buellia billewersii  – New Zealand
Buellia bogongensis  – Australia
Buellia bohlensis  – Australia

C

Buellia campbelliana 
Buellia canobolasensis 
Buellia capensis  – South Africa
Buellia carballaliana 
Buellia chionea 
Buellia christophii 
Buellia chujadoensis 
Buellia chujana  – South Korea
Buellia cinnabarina  – Australia
Buellia claricollina  – Australia
Buellia cranfieldii  – Australia
Buellia cranwelliae  – New Zealand

D

Buellia dakotensis 
Buellia desertica 
Buellia desertorum 
Buellia dialyta 
Buellia dijiana  – Australia
Buellia dimbulahensis  – Australia
Buellia diplotommoides 
Buellia disciformis 
Buellia dispersa 
Buellia durackensis  – Australia

E

Buellia ecclesensis  – Australia
Buellia eganii 
Buellia endoferruginea 
Buellia endoleuca 
Buellia epiaeruginosa  – Australia
Buellia epifimbriata 
Buellia epigaea 
Buellia epigaella  – Australia
Buellia erubescens 
Buellia ewersii  – Australia
Buellia excelsa 
Buellia extenuatella  – Australia
Buellia extremoorientalis

F

Buellia fallax  – Australia
Buellia farinulenta 
Buellia flavescens 
Buellia fluviicygnorum  – Australia
Buellia fosteri 
Buellia fraudans 
Buellia frigida 
Buellia fuliginosa

G

Buellia geophila 
Buellia georgei  – Australia
Buellia gerontoides 
Buellia griseovirens 
Buellia gypsyensis  – Falkland Islands

H
Buellia halonioides  – Australia
Buellia haywardii  – New Zealand
Buellia herveyensis  – Australia
Buellia himalayensis 
Buellia homophylia 
Buellia hyperbolica 
Buellia hypomelaena 
Buellia hypopurpurea  – New Zealand
Buellia hyporosea  – Australia
Buellia hypostictella  – New Zealand

I
Buellia iberica 
Buellia innata 
Buellia insularicola  – Kermadec Islands
Buellia insularis 
Buellia inturgescens

J
Buellia jugorum

K
Buellia kantvilasii  – New Zealand
Buellia kaproorea  – Australia
Buellia kerguelenica  – Kerguelen Islands
Buellia kimberleyana  – Australia
Buellia krempelhuberi

L

Buellia lactea 
Buellia laurocanariensis 
Buellia lepidastroidea 
Buellia leptocline 
Buellia leptoclinoides 
Buellia leucomela  – Jamaica; United States
Buellia lichexanthonica 
Buellia lobata  – Australia

M

Buellia mackeei  – New Caledonia
Buellia macveanii  – Australia
Buellia magaliesbergensis  – South Africa
Buellia maficola  – Australia
Buellia malcolmii  – New Zealand
Buellia mamillana 
Buellia marginulata 
Buellia maungatuensis  – New Zealand
Buellia mawsonii 
Buellia mayrhoferae  – Australia
Buellia mediterranea 
Buellia mesospora  – Australia
Buellia microsporella 
Buellia minispora  – Antarctica
Buellia mogensenii  – Greenland
Buellia molonglo  – Australia
Buellia morsina 
Buellia multispora

N

Buellia namaquaensis  – South Africa
Buellia nashii 
Buellia navajoensis 
Buellia nordinii  – Venezuela
Buellia northallina  – Australia
Buellia numerosa  – Japan

O

Buellia ocellata 
Buellia oidalea

P

Buellia pallidomarginata 
Buellia pannarina  – Australia
Buellia papanui  – New Zealand
Buellia patearoana  – New Zealand
Buellia penichra 
Buellia peregrina  – Africa
Buellia perexigua 
Buellia pigmentosa  – Australia
Buellia poimenae  – Australia
Buellia poolensis  – Australia
Buellia porphyrilica  – New Zealand
Buellia prothallina 
Buellia pruinosa 
Buellia pseudosubnexa 
Buellia pseudotetrapla 
Buellia psoromica  – Australia
Buellia pulverea 
Buellia pygmaea

Q
Buellia quarryana  – Australia

R
Buellia rarotongensis 
Buellia regineae 
Buellia retrovertens 
Buellia rhizocarpella  – Australia
Buellia rhizocarpica  – Mexico
Buellia rhombispora 
Buellia rimulosa 
Buellia rodseppeltii  – Antarctica
Buellia romoletia 
Buellia rosellotincta 
Buellia rubroreagens 
Buellia rugosissima  – Guatemala
Buellia russa 
Buellia ryanii

S

Buellia sanguinolenta  – Europe
Buellia saxorum 
Buellia schaereri 
Buellia seppeltii  – Macquarie Island
Buellia servilosina  – Australia
Buellia sharpiana  – United States
Buellia sheardii 
Buellia sipmanii 
Buellia spuria 
Buellia stellulata 
Buellia stigmaea 
Buellia subadjuncta  – Australia
Buellia subalbula 
Buellia subareolata  – South America
Buellia subcallispora  – Hawaii
Buellia subcoronata 
Buellia subcrassata 
Buellia subdisciformis 
Buellia subeffigurata  – South Africa
Buellia subericola 
Buellia subimmersa 
Buellia sublauri-cassiae 
Buellia submaritima 
Buellia subnumerosa  – Japan
Buellia subrepleta 
Buellia substellulans 
Buellia succedens 
Buellia sulphurica 
Buellia suttonensis  – New Zealand

T

Buellia taishanensis  – China
Buellia tergua 
Buellia testaceina  – Australia
Buellia tinderryensis  – Australia
Buellia tombadorensis 
Buellia tomnashiana  – Canary Islands
Buellia tuapekensis  – New Zealand

U
Buellia uberior 
Buellia ulleungdoensis 
Buellia ulliae 
Buellia uruguayensis

V

Buellia vandenboomii 
Buellia ventricosa 
Buellia vernicoma 
Buellia violaceofusca  – Sweden
Buellia viridula

W
Buellia weberi  – Australia
Buellia wilsoniana

X
Buellia xantholeuca 
Buellia xanthonica

Y
Buellia yilliminningensis  – Australia
Buellia yoshimurae  – Japan

References

Buellia